Rhyothemis phyllis, known as the yellow-striped flutterer or yellow-barred flutterer, is a species of dragonfly of the family Libellulidae,
widespread in South-east Asia, including Cambodia, China, India, Indonesia, Lao People's Democratic Republic, Malaysia, Myanmar, Singapore, Taiwan, Thailand, Vietnam, and northern Australia.

Rhyothemis phyllis is a small to medium-sized dragonfly, commonly found at open ponds or marshes, and swamp forests. Its flight is usually fluttering.

There are two known sub-species in Australia, Rhyothemis phyllis chloe Kirby, 1894 and Rhyothemis phyllis beatricis Lieftinck, 1942.

Gallery

See also
 List of Odonata species of Australia

References

Libellulidae
Odonata of Asia
Odonata of Australia
Insects of Asia
Insects of Southeast Asia
Taxa named by Johann Heinrich Sulzer
Insects described in 1776